Eutreta jamaicensis is a species of tephritid or fruit flies in the genus Eutreta of the family Tephritidae.

Distribution
Jamaica.

References

Tephritinae
Insects described in 1977
Diptera of North America